Iddin-Dagan (Di-din-Dda-gan), fl. c. 1910 BC — c. 1890 BC by the short chronology or c. 1975 BC — c. 1954 BC by the middle chronology) was the 3rd king of the dynasty of Isin. Iddin-Dagan was preceded by his father Shu-Ilishu. Išme-Dagān then succeeded Iddin-Dagan. Iddin-Dagan reigned for 21 years (according to the Sumerian King List.) He is best known for his participation in the sacred marriage rite and the sexually-explicit hymn that described it.

Biography

His titles included: “Mighty King” — “King of Isin” — “King of Ur” — “King of the Land of Sumer and Akkad.” The first year name recorded on a receipt for flour and dates reads: “Year Iddin-Dagān (was) king and (his) daughter Matum-Niatum (“the land which belongs to us”) was taken in marriage by the king of Anshan.” Vallat suggests it was to Imazu (son of Kindattu, who was the groom and possibly the king of the region of Shimashki) as he was described as the King of Anshan in a seal inscription, although elsewhere unattested. Kindattu had been driven away from the city-state of Ur by Išbi-Erra (the founder of the First Dynasty of Isin), however; relations had apparently thawed sufficiently for Tan-Ruhurarter (the 8th king to wed the daughter of Bilalama, the énsí of Eshnunna.)

There is only one contemporary monumental text of Iddin-Dagan that is extant. This is a fragment of a stone statue with a votive inscription which invokes Ninisina and Damu to curse those who foster evil intent against it. Two later clay tablets preserve an inscription recording an unspecified object fashioned for the god Nanna. These were found by the British archaeologist Sir Charles Leonard Woolley in a scribal school house in Ur. A tablet from the Enunmaḫ in Ur dated to the 14th year of Gungunum (fl. c. 1868 BC — c. 1841 BC) of Larsa, after his conquest of the city, bears the seal impression of a servant of his. A tablet described Iddin-Dagān’s fashioning of two copper festival statues for Ninlil, which were not delivered to Nippur until 170 years later by Enlil-bāni. Belles-lettres preserve the correspondence from Iddin-Dagān to his general Sîn-illat about Kakkulātum and the state of his troops, and from his general describing an ambush by the Martu (Amorites).

The continued fecundity of the land was ensured by the annual performance of the sacred marriage ritual in which the king impersonated the god Dumuzi-Ama-ušumgal-ana and a priestess played the role of Inanna. A hymn describing Iddin-Dagan's performance of this ritual in ten sections (Kiruḡu) indicates that this ceremony involved a procession of: male prostitutes, wise women, drummers, priestesses, and priests bloodletting with swords to the accompaniment of music, followed by offerings and sacrifices for the goddess Inanna, or Ninegala.

The ceremony reached its climax with the copulation of the king and priestess and is described thus:

There are four extant hymns addressed to Iddin-Dagan: this Sacred Marriage Hymn, a praise poem dedicated to the king, a war song, and a dedicatory prayer.

See also

 History of Sumer
 Sumerian people

Inscriptions

Notes

References

External links

 Iddin-Dagān year-names at CDLI.
 Inanna and Iddin-Dagān at ETCSL, the sacred marriage poem
 A praise poem of Iddin-Dagān at ETCSL.
 An adab to Ningublaga for Iddin-Dagān at ETCSL.War poem
 A namerima (?) for Iddin-Dagān at ETCSL.prayer

20th-century BC Sumerian kings
19th-century BC Sumerian kings
Dynasty of Isin